Josh Peters (born 4 September 1996) is a Scottish professional footballer who plays as a forward for Buckie Thistle.

Club career

Youth career
Peters started his career in the Inverness Caledonian Thistle youth ranks before transferring to Strathspey Thistle and then Hibernian.

Senior career
In 2020, Peters signed his first professional contract with Forfar Athletic and went on to score 11 times in 33 appearances for the Loons, which caught the attention of several bigger clubs in Scotland.

His good form earned him a move to Livingston in 2017.Peters struggled to break into the first team and returned to Forfar Athletic on loan.

Peters re-signed for the Loons permanently in January 2018.He struggled to find the goalscoring form from his first spell at Station Park and was soon on the move again.  The forward signed for Queen's Park in the summer of 2018 and scored twice in 12 appearances for the Spiders before departing the club after one season.

Spells at Stirling Albion and Elgin City followed over the next four years before Peters signed for Highland Football League side Buckie Thistle in 2022.

References

External links
Josh Peters on Soccerbase

1996 births
Living people
Scottish footballers
Scottish Football League players
Association football forwards
Hibernian F.C. players
Inverness Caledonian Thistle F.C. players
Forfar Athletic F.C. players
Livingston F.C. players
Stirling Albion F.C. players
Elgin City F.C. players
Buckie Thistle F.C. players

Strathspey Thistle F.C. players
Queen's Park F.C. players